This is a list of wars involving the Republic of Ecuador from 1820 to the present day.

 
Ecuador
Wars
Wars